Esteban Prats was a Cuban baseball first baseman in the Cuban League and Negro leagues. He played from 1889 to 1909 with several teams, including Almendares, Azul, All Cubans, Cuban Stars (West), Habana, and Matanzas.

References

External links

1873 births
All Cubans players
Almendares (baseball) players
Cuban Stars (West) players
Habana players
Matanzas players
San Francisco (baseball) players
Cuban League players
Year of death unknown
Cuban expatriate baseball players in the United States